"Yummy Yummy Yummy" is a song by Arthur Resnick and Joey Levine, first recorded by Ohio Express in 1968. Their version reached No. 4 on the U.S. Pop Singles chart in June and No. 5 on the UK Singles Chart. It has since been covered by many artists. Ohio Express was a studio concoction and none of the "official" members appear on the record. Joey Levine sang lead vocals.

Time Magazine included it in its 2011 list of songs with silly lyrics. It ranked No. 2 in Dave Barry's Book of Bad Songs.

The single's flip-side, titled "Zig-Zag", is an instrumental version of the 1910 Fruitgum Company's "(Poor Old) Mr. Jensen" played in reverse.

Later uses

"Yummy Yummy Yummy" has been used in the films Super Size Me, Cloudy with a Chance of Meatballs 2, and Fear and Loathing in Las Vegas.

In television, the song has been used on The Simpsons in the episodes "Itchy & Scratchy: The Movie" and "The Heartbroke Kid"; in the Monty Python's Flying Circus episode "How Not to Be Seen" (credited to the fictional band "Jackie Charlton and the Tonettes"); in the Futurama episode "Saturday Morning Fun Pit"; and a short musical segment of Timon and Pumbaa, where it is sung by the titular characters with modified lyrics.

New wave band The Cars would borrow the opening guitar chords for their 1978 hit "Just What I Needed". Pop rock band Fountains of Wayne would then in turn borrow the riff for their 2003 hit "Stacy's Mom", with their opening riff being based on "Just What I Needed".

Chart performance

Weekly charts

Year-end charts

Cover versions

Labelmates The 1910 Fruitgum Company recorded their own vocals over the same backing track for their album 1, 2, 3 Red Light.
Giorgio Moroder released a version as single A-side in 1968 (as Giorgio).
Baccara recorded a Euro Pop version in the 1970s.
Julie London recorded a cover for her album Yummy Yummy Yummy in 1968.
The Residents recorded a cover for their album The Third Reich 'n Roll in 1975.
L7 recorded a cover for their album Fast & Frightening in 2016.

References

External links
 Lyrics of this song

 

1968 singles
Ohio Express songs
1910 Fruitgum Company songs
RPM Top Singles number-one singles
Number-one singles in New Zealand
1968 songs
Joey Levine songs
Songs written by Joey Levine
Buddah Records singles
Songs written by Artie Resnick